Dardanel is a Turkish food packager based in the town of Çanakkale, Turkey, on the Dardanelles strait.

History

1984–1999 
The company was founded in 1984 by Niyazi Önen as Turkey's first producer of canned tuna fish, and was listed on the Istanbul Stock Exchange in 1994. From the 1990s the product range expanded from the "Dardanel Ton" canned tuna to other canned foods and ready-made sandwiches. Dardanel is authorized to use the Dolphin Safe badge on its products. 

In 1991, the company started sponsoring the football club Çanakkale Dardanelspor A.Ş, and has been a sponsor ever since.

2010s–present 
In 2011, the company opened a fish and bread restaurant chain called Dardenia, with the first restaurant being opened in Bağdat Avenue. 

In 2021, Dardanel acquired Greek seafood company G. Kallimanis for 6.2 million euros.

References

External links
Official site

Turkish companies established in 1984
Companies of Turkey
Food and drink companies established in 1984
Food and drink companies of Turkey